Sonja Patrice Tate (born September 7, 1971) is an American basketball coach and former player. She played for Columbus Quest of the American Basketball League, where she won championships over each of her two seasons. She then played for the Minnesota Lynx of the WNBA for two seasons (1999-2000).

She played college basketball for the Arkansas State University Red Wolves. At ASU, she scored 2,312 points, which is the most of any basketball player in school history.

She is originally from Crittenden County, Arkansas and is a member of the Arkansas Sports Hall of Fame. In 2015, she was hired to coach the Arkansas State University Mid-South. In 2016–17, she led the team to a regional championship. In 2019, she was hired to coach at Paragould High School.

WNBA career statistics

Regular season

|-
| align="left" | 1999
| align="left" | Minnesota
| 32 || 18 || 25.9 || .354 || .239 || .767 || 4.0 || 3.1 || 1.1 || 0.1 || 2.0 || 4.5
|-
| align="left" | 2000
| align="left" | Minnesota
| 8 || 0 || 11.8 || .455 || .545 || .500 || 1.6 || 0.6 || 0.4 || 0.0 || 0.9 || 3.4
|-
| align="left" | Career
| align="left" | 2 years, 1 team
| 40 || 18 || 23.1 || .367 || .282 || .750 || 3.5 || 2.6 || 1.0 || 0.1 || 1.8 || 4.3

Arkansas State statistics

Source

References

1971 births
Living people
American women's basketball coaches
American women's basketball players
Arkansas State Red Wolves women's basketball players
Basketball coaches from Arkansas
Basketball players from Arkansas
Columbus Quest players
Guards (basketball)
Minnesota Lynx players
People from West Memphis, Arkansas